Abamectin is a widely used insecticide and anthelmintic. Abamectin, is a member of the Avermectin family and is a natural fermentation product of soil dwelling actinomycete Streptomyces avermitilis. Abamectin (also called Avermectin B1), differs from Ivermectin, the popular member of the Avermectin family, by double bond on C-22-25. Fermentation of Streptomyces avermitilis yields 8 closely related Avermectin homologues out of which B1 (a and b) forms the bulk of the fermentation. The non proprietary name, abamectin, is a combination of Bla (~ 80%) and B1b (~ 20%). Out of all the Avermectins, abamectin is the only one that is used both in agriculture and pharmaceuticals.

Mode of Action 
Avermectins bind to the glutamate-gated chloride channels that are found in invertebrate nerve and muscle cells. They cause hyperpolarization of these cells resulting in paralysis and death. Mammals only possess glutamate-gated chloride channels in the brain and spinal cord and as the Avermectins have a low affinity for other mammalian ligand-gated channels and do not usually cross the blood–brain barrier, they are very safe for mammals.

History
Avermectins were discovered in 1967 in fermentation broths of an actinomycete culture received from the Kitasato Institute in Japan, following an intensive search designed to find natural products with anthelmintic activity. It was not until 1985 ivermectin was first used to treat Onchocerca volvulus (Onchocerciasis or River blindness) in humans by the United Nations. Discoverers of Avermectin,  William C. Campbell and Satoshi Ōmura, shared the 2015 Nobel prize for physiology or medicine.

Activity
Abamectin is an insecticide as well as an acaricide (miticide) and a nematicide. It is also used to control fire ants. Abamectin is provided orally to horses for deworming them.

Use
Abamectin is also used as a veterinary antihelmintic.  Resistance to abamectin-based antihelmintics, although a growing problem, is not as common as to other classes of veterinary antihelmintics. The benzoate salt emamectin benzoate is also used as an insecticide. Avermectins have been used to treat various ailments caused by parasites in both humans and animals. Avermectins including abamectin were studied for use as anti alcohol therapies. Recently, ivermectin is being studied for use as an anti inflammatory agent.

Environmental Fate 
Abamectin degrades rapidly when exposed to light (photodegradation) on plant surfaces, in soil, dung and water. Half life of Avermectins (including abamectin) varies between 0.5 and 23 days depending on the rate and substrate (water, soil, faeces or plant). Avermectin B1a applied at 0.02-0.03 lb ai/acre (50% higher than recommended rates) resulted in very low residue.

Non targets 
Abamectin is highly toxic to bees either if they consume or come in direct contact. However, plant parts exposed to abamectin spraying did not cause toxicity to bees 24 hours after treatment. The reason for lower toxicity in foliage is due to a half life <24 hours in plant surfaces.

Trade names 
Trade names include Abba, Abathor, Affirm, Agri-Mek, Avid, Dynamec, Epi-Mek, Genesis Horse Wormer, Reaper, Termictine 5%, Vertimec,
CAM-MEK 1.8% EC (cam for agrochemicals), Zephyr and Cure 1.8 EC.

References

Further reading 

 
 

Antiparasitic agents
Insecticides
Macrocycles